Monocyclic monoterpene ketone monooxygenase (1-hydroxy-2-oxolimonene 1,2-monooxygenase, dihydrocarvone 1,2-monooxygenase, MMKMO) is an enzyme with systematic name (-)-menthone,NADPH:oxygen oxidoreductase. This enzyme catalyses the following chemical reaction

 (1) (-)-menthone + NADPH + H+ + O2  (4R,7S)-7-isopropyl-4-methyloxepan-2-one + NADP+ + H2O
 (2) dihydrocarvone + NADPH + H+ + O2  4-isopropenyl-7-methyloxepan-2-one + NADP+ + H2O
 (3) (iso)-dihydrocarvone + NADPH + H+ + O2  6-isopropenyl-3-methyloxepan-2-one + NADP+ + H2O
 (4a) 1-hydroxymenth-8-en-2-one + NADPH + H+ + O2  7-hydroxy-4-isopropenyl-7-methyloxepan-2-one + NADP+ + H2O
 (4b) 7-hydroxy-4-isopropenyl-7-methyloxepan-2-one  3-isopropenyl-6-oxoheptanoate (spontaneous)

Monocyclic monoterpene ketone monooxygenase is a flavoprotein (FAD).

References

External links 
 

EC 1.14.13